Doncaster Rovers F.C. (DRFC) are an English association football club

DRFC may also refer to:

In association football:
Dagenham & Redbridge F.C.
Deeping Rangers F.C.
Dunmurry Recreation F.C.

In rugby union:
Darlington RFC
Dartmouth Rugby Football Club
Derby RFC
Doncaster R.F.C.
Dorchester Rugby Football Club
Dunstablians R.F.C.

In Australian rules football:
Deniliquin Rovers Football Club